The Pakistan national cricket team toured Australia in the 1981–82 season and played 3 Test matches against Australia. Australia won the series 2-1.

Test series summary

First Test

Second Test

Third Test

External sources
 CricketArchive – tour summaries

Annual reviews
 Playfair Cricket Annual 1982
 Wisden Cricketers' Almanack 1982

Further reading
 Chris Harte, A History of Australian Cricket, André Deutsch, 1993
 

1981 in Australian cricket
1981 in Pakistani cricket
1981–82 Australian cricket season
1982 in Australian cricket
1982 in Pakistani cricket
International cricket competitions from 1980–81 to 1985
1981-82